U.K. Schmidt–Caltech Asteroid Survey, or U.K. Schmidt Telescope–Caltech asteroid survey, or UCAS is the joint astronomical survey performed in 1982. This survey are no longer exist as separate entity, but rather integrated into astorb asteroids database. 
The UCAS catalog data format is plain text, after uncompressing by unzip or gunzip it can be seen by any text viewers or by online ADC viewer. Specifications for catalog format are provided on the download sites.

Database download locations 
 Download page for asteroids database, including UCAS database, 2001
 Download page for asteroids database, including UCAS database, 1998
 Caltech asteroids database, including UCAS database, 1996

See also
UK Schmidt Telescope
Schmidt telescope

Observational astronomy
Astronomical catalogues
California Institute of Technology